The Little Langley River is a  tributary of the Langley River of Minnesota, United States. It is part of the Cloquet River watershed, flowing to the Saint Louis River and ultimately Lake Superior.

See also
List of rivers of Minnesota

References

Minnesota Watersheds
USGS Hydrologic Unit Map - State of Minnesota (1974)

Rivers of Minnesota
Tributaries of Lake Superior
Rivers of Lake County, Minnesota